The Sugar Factory is a 1999 Australian film directed by Robert Carter and Matt Day and Rhondda Findleton.

References

External links

The Sugar Factory at Urban Cinefile
The Sugar Factory at Oz Movies

Australian comedy-drama films
1999 films
1990s English-language films
1990s Australian films